Sir Robert Alexander Talma Stheeman  (born 7 June 1959) is chief executive officer of the Debt Management Office.
He previously had a distinguished banking career in the UK and Europe.

Stheeman was born in the United Kingdom and educated at Stowe school  before joining the Vereins und Westbank in Hamburg, Germany in 1979, where he qualified as an official Bankkaufmann.

In 1986 Stheeman joined Deutsche Bank AG in Frankfurt.  He subsequently worked as a Director in the Debt Capital Markets group of Deutsche Bank in London, leading relationships with sovereign issuers and official institutions.

In 2003 Stheeman was appointed Chief Executive of the UK Debt Management Office (DMO), an executive agency of HM Treasury responsible for carrying out the UK Government’s debt and cash management operations, including issuing gilts to raise long term finance for the government and operating in the money markets to manage the government’s cash flows.
The DMO also oversees the statutory functions of the Commissioners for the Reduction of National Debt and the Public Works Loans Board.

As Chief Executive, Stheeman is accountable to Treasury ministers for advising on and delivering the UK Government’s cash financing requirements and the issuance of government bonds. Between 2003 and 2019 Stheeman raised £2 trillion of borrowing.

Stheeman is the son of Sape Talma Stheeman and Cecile Talma Stheeman (nee Mendelssohn Bartholdy) and has been married to Elisabeth Stheeman since 1989. They have four sons.

On 31 December 2015, Stheeman was knighted in the 2016 New Year Honours for services to UK Government Debt Management. He was appointed a Companion of the Order of the Bath in the New Year Honours 2008.

References

1959 births
Living people
English businesspeople
Companions of the Order of the Bath
Knights Bachelor
People educated at Stowe School